Agrostis blasdalei is a species of grass known by the common name Blasdale's bent grass. It is endemic to the coast of northern California, where it grows in habitat along the immediate coastline, such as dunes and bluffs.

Description
It is a perennial grass growing in tufts up to 30 centimeters tall. It has short, thready leaves a few centimeters long. The inflorescence is a thin cylindrical array of tiny spikelets, each up to 4 millimeters in length.

References

External links
Jepson Manual Treatment
Blasdale bentgrass (AGBL) on USDA Plants Profile
Photos of agrostis blasdalei on CalPhotos, UC Berkeley

blasdalei
Endemic flora of California
Native grasses of California